Abercorn Street is a prominent street  in Savannah, Georgia, United States. It is concurrent with SR 204 from 37th Street south. The street is named for James Hamilton, 6th Earl of Abercorn, a financial benefactor of the Georgia colony. Its northern section passes through the Savannah Historic District, a National Historic Landmark District.

On the northern side of Bay Street, the Abercorn Street Ramp leads down through Factors Walk to River Street at the Savannah River.

Abercorn Street goes around four of Savannah's 22 squares. They are (from north to south):

Reynolds Square
Oglethorpe Square
Lafayette Square
Calhoun Square

Notable buildings and structures

Below is a selection of notable buildings and structures on Abercorn Street, all in Savannah's Historic District. From north to south:

The Olde Pink House, 23 Abercorn Street (1789)
Oliver Sturges House, 27 Abercorn Street (1813)
Planters Inn, 29 Abercorn Street (1913)
Lucas Theatre, 32 Abercorn Street (1921)
Owens–Thomas House, 124 Abercorn Street (1819)
Mary Marshall Houses, 127–129 Abercorn Street
Andrew Low House, 329 Abercorn Street (1849)
Hamilton–Turner Inn, 330 Abercorn Street (1873)
Clary's Cafe, 404 Abercorn Street
John Mingledorff Property, 439 Abercorn Street (1856)
Algernon Hartridge House, 516 Abercorn Street (1870)

References in popular culture
The street is also featured several times in John Berendt's 1994 book Midnight in the Garden of Good and Evil.

In the subsequent 1997 movie, The Lady Chablis says her fourth boyfriend "is a mechanic over there on Abercorn", to which John Cusack's character John Kelso replies, "I know where that is." A celebration of the life of The Lady Chablis took place at the Lucas Theatre on Abercorn Street in November 2016, following her death two months earlier.

References

Roads in Savannah, Georgia
Streets in Georgia (U.S. state)